The 2022 LBA Playoffs, officially known as the 2022 LBA Playoff UnipolSai, is the ongoing postseason tournament of the 2021–22 LBA season, which began on 25 September 2021. The playoffs started on May 15, 2021, with the match Milano–Reggiana. Virtus Segafredo Bologna are the defending champions, from the season 2020–21.

Qualified teams 
The eight first qualified teams after the end of the regular season were qualified to the playoffs.

Bracket

Quarterfinals 
All times were in Central European Summer Time (UTC+02:00)
The quarterfinals were played in a best of five format.

|}

Game 1

Game 2

Game 3

Game 4

Semifinals 
The semifinals were played in a best of five format.

|}

Game 1

Game 2

Game 3

Finals 
The finals are being played in a best of seven format.

|}

Game 1

Game 2

Game 3

Game 4

Game 5

Game 6

References

External links
Official website

2021–22 in Italian basketball
LBA Playoffs